Prokofyevo is a rural locality (a village) in Andreyevskoye Rural Settlement, Alexandrovsky District, Vladimir Oblast, Russia. The population was 35 as of 2010.

Geography 
Prokofyevo is located 21 km east of Alexandrov (the district's administrative centre) by road. Mezhakovo is the nearest rural locality.

References 

Rural localities in Alexandrovsky District, Vladimir Oblast